Khalid Al-Rashaid (born 3 August 1974) is a Saudi Arabian former footballer. He competed in the men's tournament at the 1996 Summer Olympics.

References

External links
 

1974 births
Living people
Saudi Arabian footballers
Saudi Arabia international footballers
Olympic footballers of Saudi Arabia
Footballers at the 1996 Summer Olympics
1996 AFC Asian Cup players
Al Hilal SFC players
Al-Riyadh SC players
Al-Fayha FC players
Saudi Professional League players
Saudi First Division League players
Place of birth missing (living people)
Association football midfielders